Sabotain: Break the Rules is a Russian video game developed by Avalon Style Entertainment and published by Akella in November 2004.

It is inspired by films such as The Fifth Element. It was originally a game entitled Sabotain by  CDV Software, but the project was later revived by Akella. It entered the alpha stage on July 17, 2002. 

Interia wrote that the only design aspect they liked was the music. Stop deemed it Russian's answer to Deus Ex. XTGamers felt it was weak in terms of graphics and technology. Igray liked the big, diverse world. Absolute Games thought the game had too many compounding bugs to be fun. Jeuxvideo described the AI as "shameful".

References

External links 

 Main page

2004 video games
First-person shooters
Video games developed in Russia
Video games set in the future
Windows games
Windows-only games
Akella games
Multiplayer and single-player video games